Theban can refer to:
 A thing or person of or from the city of Thebes, Greece.
 A thing or person of or from the city of Thebes, Egypt.
 The occult Theban alphabet